Il Discotto Productions was the second biggest Italo disco record label and distribution company.

It was founded in 1982, and managed by Roberto Fusar-Poli. The company started in Sesto San Giovanni, and then moved to Cologno Monzese in 1983, two towns in the Greater Milan area. It was one of the most successful Italian labels of the 1980s, rivaling with Discomagic.

Discotto released material by many well-known artists like Gary Low, Scotch, Doctor's Cat, Brand Image, Gazebo, Martinelli, Paul Sharada, Betty Miranda, Reeds, Mike Rogers, Raggio Di Luna, Hot Cold, Eugene, Max Coveri, Gay Cat Park, as well as obscure Italo disco acts. In its early releases, the Il Discotto label had a strong electro sound.

Il Discotto closed down in the first half of 1987 due to financial issues. The only labels that survived and became independent were Blow Up Disco (until 1998) and Keepon Musik (until 1991).

Sub-labels
American Disco
Blow Up Disco
Crash
Did Records / D.I.D. Records
F.D.T. (Fuori Di Testa)
Keepon Musik
Shure Music
Thick Record
Tanga Label

References

External links
 

Italian record labels
Cologno Monzese
Record labels established in 1982
Record labels disestablished in 1987
1982 establishments in Italy
Electronic dance music record labels